The MZ SM 125 is a lightweight motard that was made by MZ Motorrad- und Zweiradwerk GmbH in Germany.

Production ended at or before the Zschopau factory's closing in 2008. It gained particular popularity among the stunt fans.

References

S